Mexican recording artist Luis Miguel has released 21 studio albums, 30 compilation albums, three extended plays (EP) two live albums, two soundtrack albums and five box set. Luis Miguel has sold over 60 million records, making him one of the best-selling Latin music artists of all time. Luis Miguel is also the artist with the second-most number ones on the Billboard Top Latin Albums chart with nine albums. At the age of 11, he released his debut studio album, Un Sol (1982), which was certified platinum and gold in Mexico. The artist would release four more studio albums under the record label EMI: Directo al Corazón (1982), Decídete (1983), También es Rock (1984), and Palabra de Honor (1984). A Portuguese-language version of Decídete and Palabra de Honor were released in Brazil as Decide Amor and Meu Sonho Perdido, respectively. Luis Miguel made his acting debut in the film as the lead role on Ya nunca más (1984) and recorded its soundtrack. In 1985, he participated in the Sanremo Music Festival 1985 with the song "Noi ragazzi di oggi"; it placed second in the Big Artist category and was later included on the Italian-language edition of Palabra de Honor. In the same year, Luis Miguel recorded the soundtrack for the film Fiebre de amor, which he co-starred with fellow Mexican singer Lucero.

In 1986, Luis Miguel left EMI and signed with Warner Music following a fallout from his father, Luisito Rey, and his mother's disappearance. His first record under Warner Music was Soy Como Quiero Ser (1987), which was produced by Spanish musician Juan Carlos Calderón. Calderón had previously composed several of the tracks on Palabra de Honor The album was promoted by its lead single, "Ahora Te Puedes Marchar" and became the artist's first chart topper on the Billboard Hot Latin Songs chart. Soy Como Quiero Ser was followed by Busca una Mujer (1988) and 20 Años (1990), which were also produced by Calderón. The albums reached peaked at number four and two on the Billboard Latin Pop Albums chart, respectively. The songs on his early recordings were characterized as soft rock and pop ballad tunes, which led to Miguel becoming a teen idol. With his first three albums under Warner Music label he sold over three million copies only in Mexico.

In 1991, Luis Miguel released Romance, a collection of bolero covers and co-produced with Armando Manzanero. With sales of over eight million copies, it is his best-selling record and was credited with reviving mainstream interest in the bolero genre. Luis Miguel would record three more bolero albums:  Segundo Romance (1994), Romances (1997), and Mis Romances (2001). The first three bolero albums were certified platinum in the United States by the Recording Industry Association of America (RIAA), making him the first Latino artist to have two Spanish-language records with this achievement. Segundo Romance and Romances are also among the best-selling Latin albums in the US.  The artist concluded the bolero recordings with the release of the compilation album Mis Boleros Favoritos (2002), following poor sales of Mis Romances. With only his bolero albums he sold 23 million copies worldwide.

In between the Romance-themed studio records, Luis Miguel released three pop studio albums: Aries (1993), Nada Es Igual... (1996), and Amarte Es un Placer (1999). Aries received a diamond certification in Argentina by the Argentine Chamber of Phonograms and Videograms Producers (CAPIF) while Nada Es Igual... and Amarte Es un Placer were certified gold in the US by the RIAA. In 2003, Luis Miguel released another pop record, 33, which topped the Top Latin Albums chart in the US, but was otherwise not commercially well received. It was followed by México en la Piel (2004), his first album of mariachi standards and it received a diamond certification in Mexico. Afterwards, Luis Miguel released his first greatest hits album under Warner Music, Grandes Éxitos (2005) which consists of all previously recorded material since he began working with the label in 1987 as well as two original tracks ("Misterios del Amor" and "Si Te Perdiera"); it reached number one on the Mexican Albums Chart. In 2006, he released Navidades, a Spanish-language Christmas album. Two years later, he collaborated with Spanish songwriter Manuel Alejandro to compose and produce his 19th studio record, Cómplices. It was then succeeded by his self-titled album in 2010. All three recordsreached number one on the Billboard Top Latin Albums chart. After seven years, which was marked with legal and health issues, he released his second album of mariachi covers, ¡México Por Siempre! (2017).

Studio albums

Reissues

Live albums

Soundtrack albums

Compilation albums

Remix albums

Extended plays

Box sets

See also 
 Lists of fastest-selling albums
 List of best-selling Latin albums
 List of best-selling Latin albums in the United States
 List of best-selling albums in Argentina
 List of best-selling albums in Brazil
 List of best-selling albums in Chile
 List of best-selling albums in Mexico
 List of best-selling albums in Spain
 Luis Miguel singles discography

Notes

References

Discographies of Mexican artists
Latin pop music discographies